Marduk-apla-iddina I, contemporarily written in cuneiform as  dAMAR.UTU-IBILA-SUM-na and meaning in Akkadian: "Marduk has given an heir", was the 34th Kassite king of Babylon ca. 1171–1159 BC (short chronology). He was the son and successor of Melišipak, from whom he had previously received lands, as recorded on a kudurru, and he reigned for 13 years. His reign is contemporary with the Late Bronze Age collapse. He is sometime referred to as Merodach-Baladan I.

Biography

He claimed, like his father, descent from Kurigalzu and evidently kept court in Dūr-Kurigalzu itself because tablets found in the burnt ruins of the Tell-el-Abyad quarter which marked the later Elamite destruction of the city, are dated in the first two years of his reign. These include lists of garments received or distributed for the New Year, or akitu, festival  and indicate a normal economic relationship with Babylonia's western and eastern neighbors, the Subarians and Elamites respectively, whose singers apparently entertained the royal household. Documents surviving from his reign date only as late as his sixth year and include his repair of the E-zida temple at Borsippa, where he credited the god Enlil with raising him to kingship despite recording this in an inscription wholly dedicated to Marduk.
 
There is evidence of thriving commerce in woolen garments with Assyrian traders, and numerous royal land grants in northern and especially northeastern Babylonia. The Chronicle of the Market Prices references his 21st year, but neither king with this name ruled longer than 13 years. Like his two predecessors, some of the economic texts show a curious double-dating formula which has yet to be satisfactorily explained. The Synchronistic King List gives his Assyrian contemporary as Ninurta-apal-Ekur, which is unlikely as he is also shown against the earlier two Kassite kings, despite his short reign.

Kudurrus

Several inscribed kudurrus, or boundary stones, survive which document large donations of land and tax exemptions during his reign. Marduk-zākir-šumi, the bēl pīḫati, or provincial governor, was the beneficiary of a piece of land as a perquisite from the king. He was son of Nabû-nadin-aḫe, grandson of Rimeni-Marduk, great grandson of Uballissu-Marduk, who had been šatammu, or an official under Kurigalzu II’s regime and descendant of Arad-Ea, um-mi-a-niğ2-kas7, scholar of accounting. His responsibilities included inspector of temple and land and controller of forced labor. One of the witnesses was Nabû-šakin-šumi, also described as “son of” Arad-Ea. Another stele records that Ina-Esağila-zēra-ibni, “son of” Arad-Ea, measured a field, after replacing the previous land surveyor.

The symbol of the stylus, representing the god of writing and wisdom, Nabû, makes its first appearance on one of his kudurrus. A kudurru comes with an unusual trinity of gods in its invocation of a divine curse, “May Nabû, Nanaya and Tašmētum, lords of the decrees and decisions, surround him with evil and search him out for misfortune.”

The continuity of the reign with those earlier in the dynasty is evident in a kudurru providing confirmation of an earlier land grant by Adad-šuma-uṣur and a copy of a kudurru from the reign of Nazi-Maruttaš, the original of which was destroyed when a wall collapsed on it. Kudurrus were also used to record legal settlements, and two examples include a lawsuit concerning land in Ḫudadu (Baghdad?) province, on the Elamite border east of the Tigris from his accession year, and one recording legal actions over a field.

List of kudurrus dated to this reign

Around eighteen kudurrus could be assigned to his reign based upon the art-history of their iconography. The following lists those which actually identify him as the monarch in their texts.

 Land grant to Marduk-zākir-šumi kudurru, the bēl pīḫati
 Land grant to Munnabittu kudurru
 Uzbi-Enlil kudurru
 Broken kudurru of Marduk-apla-iddina
 Adad-bēl-kala kudurru confirming a gift by the earlier king Adad-šuma-uṣur 
 Fragmentary kudurru of Marduk-apla-iddina
 The Tehran kudurru

Also dated to his reign is the stone copy of the Nazimaruttaš kudurru stone.

End of his reign

The events at the end of his reign are uncertain, but it is clear from later sources that it ended dramatically, when Elamite troops led by Shutruk-Nahhunte, who had married a sister of Marduk-apla-iddina, invaded Babylonia and sacked several cities, including the capital. Whether these events were the cause of his demise, or whether they followed a succession crisis in which Zababa-šuma-iddina, an individual whose relationship with Marduk-apla-iddina is unknown, attempted to succeed him to the kingship, has yet to be determined.

The Prophecy A text may portray him in the figure of the 4th king, whose 13-year reign ends with an Elamite attack on Akkad, the booty of Akkad taken away, confusion, social disorder, usurpation and famine, events which seem to mirror much of what is known about this period.

Inscriptions

Notes

References

12th-century BC Babylonian kings
Kassite kings
12th-century BC rulers